The 1976 Australian Sports Car Championship was an Australian national motor racing title for drivers of Group D Production Sports Cars.  It was sanctioned by the Confederation of Australian Motor Sport as the eighth Australian Sports Car Championship and was the first to be restricted to production based cars.

The championship was won by Ian Geoghegan driving a Porsche Carrera.

Schedule
The championship was contested over five rounds:

Points system
Championship points were awarded on a 9, 6, 4, 3, 2, 1 basis for the first six places at each round.

Championship standings

References

Further reading
 Australian Competition Yearbook, 1977

Australian Sports Car Championship
Sports Car Championship